was a politician of the Liberal Party, representing Kyoto in the House of Councillors for four consecutive terms.

Early life

Politics

He was elected to the House of Councillors in 1946, a seat he won four times. During his tenure as a councilor, Ōnogi served as Deputy Agent to the signing of the Treaty of San Francisco, Chairman of the LDP in the House of Councillors, the first President of the LDP (Kyoto Branch), and Minister of State in the 3rd, 4th and 5th Yoshida cabinets.

Ōnogi's private residence, a State Guest House built to entertain foreign dignitaries is now a wedding venue and French restaurant, managed by the Ōnogi family in the Yamashina Ward of Kyoto.

Later life

Ōnogi served as Chairman of the Kyoto Chamber of Commerce and Industry and was active directing a number of shrines and temples, such as Kurama-dera, Chion-in, Myōshin-ji and Sennyū-ji. He was active in the education industry, serving as Director of Ritsumeikan University, Kyoto Pharmaceutical University and Kyoto University of Foreign Studies.

See also
Kyoto at-large district

External links
 Kyoto State Guesthouse
 Yoshida 4th Cabinet

1895 births
1966 deaths
Liberal Democratic Party (Japan) politicians
Members of the House of Representatives (Japan)
Members of the House of Councillors (Japan)
Government ministers of Japan
People from Kyoto Prefecture